Ayanamsa, also ayanabhāga, is the Sanskrit term for many systems used in Hindu astrology to account for the precession of equinoxes. There are also systems of ayanamsa used in Western sidereal astrology, such as the Fagan/Bradley Ayanamsa.

Overview
There are various systems of Ayanamsa that are in use in Hindu astrology (also known as Vedic astrology) such as the Raman Ayanamsa and the Krishnamurthy Ayanamsa, but the Lahiri Ayanamsa, named after its inventor, astronomer N.C. Lahiri, is by far the most prevalent system in India. Critics of Lahiri Ayanamsa have proposed an ayanamsa called True Chitra Paksha Ayanamsa. There are other existing ayanamsa such as Raman, Pushya Paksha, Rohini, Kërr A.I, Usha Shashi and Chandra Hari. 

The use of ayanamsa to account for the precession of equinoxes is believed to have been defined in Vedic texts at least 2,500 years before the Greek astronomer Hipparchus quantified the precession of equinoxes in 127 B.C.

See also 
 Western sidereal astrology

References

External links

 Controversial topics in astrology and Vedic astronomy

Technical factors of Hindu astrology